Mark Armstrong (born 1958) is a British amateur astronomer, a member of the British Astronomical Association. With his wife Claire Armstrong, he works from Rolvenden, Kent, England (obs. code 960). As of 2006, has 58 supernova discoveries (and 12 co-discoveries) to his credit in addition to two asteroids.

References

External links 
  Very short biography
  Includes photo of Mark

1958 births
21st-century British astronomers
20th-century British astronomers
Discoverers of asteroids

Living people
People from Rolvenden